Sir Alexander Condie Stephen  (20 July 1850 – 10 May 1908) was a British diplomat and translator from Russian and Persian.

He was the first translator of Lermontov's long poem "The Demon" into English, in 1875. He translated "Fairy Tales of a Parrot" from Persian in 1880.

In 1884-5, he was Assistant Commissioner on the Afghan Boundary Commission. he had the crucial role of keeping communications open between the Commission, in north-west Afghanistan and threatened by a large Russian army, and the British government in London. When the Commission's presence almost triggered a war in the aftermath of the Panjdeh incident, he was sent to London to report to the government in person.

He was knighted KCVO on 24 August 1900, for being HM minister resident in Dresden and Coburg. He was Groom in Waiting to King Edward VII from 1901.

He was caricatured in a Vanity Fair "Spy" print on 18 December 1902, as "Russian, Persian and Turkish".

Stephen is buried in Brompton Cemetery, London.

References

External links

1850 births
1908 deaths
British diplomats
English translators
Knights Commander of the Order of St Michael and St George
Knights Commander of the Royal Victorian Order
Companions of the Order of the Bath
Burials at Brompton Cemetery
Russian–English translators
Persian–English translators
19th-century British translators
British expatriates in Germany